The La Consolacion College Daet is a private Catholic school run by the Augustinian Sisters of Our Lady of Consolation (ASOLC) in Daet, Camarines Norte, Philippines. It was founded in 1948 and named Daet Parochial School by Monsignor Antonino O. Reganit, the then parish priest of St. John the Baptist Parish.

The founder's dream of putting up a Catholic co-educational institution in the parish was made a reality by the generosity of the Daet Parishioners and the moral and financial support extended by Msgr. Pedro P. Santos, Bishop of Nueva Caceres, and the then governor of the province, Hon. Governor Wilfredo Panotes.

The school opened on July 5, 1948, with 220 young children as the initial batch of enrollees. Named Daet Parochial School, the school graduated its first elementary pupils on April 11, 1949, of school year, 1948–1949 and its first high school students on April 15, 1953.

The school's operation and management was turned over to the Augustinian Sisters in SY 1949–1950 with Sr. Ambrosia, OSA as first Directress/Principal and Sr. Juana, OSA as the first Mother Superior.

With the turn over, the name of the school was changed from Daet Parochial School to La Consolacion School of Daet. This change came in 1970 at the advent of Vatican II. From then on, the Family Council (FC), an organization of parents and teachers of the school, and the Board of Trustees had been made functional.

The La Consolacion School of Daet adopted the Catholic Schools-Systems Development (CS-SD) Program and the Social Orientation-Education Program (SO-EP CIP) in 1983.  The school went through a series of Congregational Evaluation Visits (CEV) with the aim of accreditation by the Philippine Accrediting Association of Schools, Colleges and Universities (PAASCU).  While in the evaluation stage, the La Consolacion School of Daet worked for the offering of collegiate courses and was successfully granted permits and recognition to offer Liberal Arts, Commerce and Education courses. As La Consolacion College – Daet since 1986, the school now has 2,284 enrolled students.

History
Four Catalan Augustinian Sisters arrived in Manila from the port of Barcelona, Spain, on April 6, 1883, to dedicate themselves to care for and educate the orphans of the 1882 cholera epidemic by establishing the Asilo-Colegio de Manadaloya. More Spanish Sisters came the following year but the tedious work and social condition of the country forced most of the Sisters to return to Spain with the exception of Sisters Rita and Joaquina Barcelo Y Pages.

When the Filipino-American War broke out, the remaining Spanish Sisters were forced to abandon the first ten Filipino Sisters. In 1899, these Filipino Sisters took possession of the Franciscan buildings in Sampaloc and opened an  just in time for the start of classes in June. In 1902, through the beseeching of the clergy, the orphanage-school became a full-pledge academic institution whose objective was to provide training to those intending to pass the civil service exam that the students might be able to teach in the public schools. The first to be recognized of all private schools in Manila, G. A. O'Reilly, Superintendent of Private Schools, described it "most proficient".

Many years before the outbreak of World War II, a dream for a Catholic school had already been conceived by the parish priests who were assigned in the Parish of St. John the Baptist. It was only in 1948, however, with the assignment of Rev. Msgr. Antonino O. Reganit as the parish priest, that the dream became a reality.

After the fury of typhoon "Jean" in January 1948, Msgr. Antonino O. Reganit busied himself with the reconstruction of the damaged convent which he promised to convert into a parochial school. With the support of his assistant Parish Priest Rev. Fr. Salvador I. Naz and the zealous efforts exerted by Mr. Lucio Magana, co-founder and the first principal together with the parishioners and the then Hon. Gov. Wilfredo Panotes, the Daet Parochial School came into existence.

On the historic day of July 5, 1948, 220 school children enrolled at the Daet Parochial School, making it as one of the Catholic Educational institutions in Camarines Norte. The school had its first commencement exercises on April 11, 1949, with 18 pupils graduating from the elementary course.

Upon the request of Bishop Pedro Santos, D.D., the Augustinian Sisters of the Philippines agreed to manage the school beginning SY 1949–1950 with Sor. Ma. Ambrosia Marte, OSA as Mother Superior. In SY 1950–1954, it was Sor Salvadora de la Circumcision, OSA who became the Principal. The legacy brought by the Augustinian Sisters and the pioneer teachers were carried on until the first High School graduation on April 15 of 1953. Sor Ma. Victoria de la Resurreccion, OSA became the Directress for SY 1955–1956. True to their objectives, the Augustinian Sisters provided the school children with physical, intellectual and spiritual guidance making Daet Parochial School a truly Catholic institution.

Academics 
K to 12

Senior High School

 Academic Track 
 Accountancy, Business and Management Strand 
 General Academic Strand 
 Humanities and Social Science Strand 
 Science, Technology, Engineering and Mathematics Strand 
 Technical Vocational Livelihood Track 
 Combination A 
 Food and Beverage Services NCII  
 Bread and Pastry Production NCII
 Cookery NCII
 Combination B 
 Housekeeping NCII
 Local Tour Guiding NCII
 Front Officer Services NCII
 Tourism Promotion Services NCII
 Computer Systems Servicing NCII

College Courses

 Bachelor of Science in Computer Science 
 Bachelor of Science in Hospitality Management 
 Bachelor of Science in Information Systems 
 Bachelor of Science in Nursing 
 Bachelor of Science in Tourism Management

Libraries 
The LCCD library consists of two libraries: Basic Education library and College Education library. 
 
 
The library assumes the function of providing not only information but also training that will develop students to become useful members of the society. The role of the library in the school has been expressed in service that the library renders to the whole school community. The school librarian must be fully aware of the possibilities of library service in the educational development of boys and girls.

LCCD Philosophy of Education 
The La Consolacion College of Daet, Inc., in its love and commitment to Christ and in recognition of its participation in the co-creation of God's Kingdom on earth and its final fulfillment, sees the challenge to work in the building of a Filipino nation along the Christian order.

The LCCD believes in the dignity of human person thereby promotes an Augustinian Catholic nationalist education that will work for and with others towards human development and to act as catalysts for social change.

The institution advocates a progressive and dynamic education, which upholds academic excellence, human values and social responsibilities for a mature and responsive Christian living.

See also
La Consolacion College - Baao, Camarines Sur
La Consolacion College - Bacolod, Negros Occidental
La Consolacion College – Biñan, Laguna
La Consolacion College - Iriga, Camarines Sur
La Consolacion College – Manila, Metro Manila
 La Consolacion College – Novaliches - Caloocan, Metro Manila
La Consolacion University Philippines, Malolos, Bulacan

References 
https://officiallccd.wixsite.com/lccd

Universities and colleges in Camarines Norte